Jan Kuyckx (born 20 May 1979 in Hasselt) is a former Belgian racing cyclist.

Major results

1997
1st  Junior National Time Trial Championships
1999
1st  U23 National Road Race Championships
2001
1st Stage 10 Girobio
3rd Zellik–Galmaarden
2003
2nd Brussels–Ingooigem
2004
1st Stages 1 & 3 Vuelta a La Rioja
1st Stage 6 Tour of Austria
2005
1st Stage 4 Tour of Belgium
2006
2nd Halle–Ingooigem
2008
1st Stage 1 Étoile de Bessèges
2nd Paris–Tours
2010
1st Grote 1-MeiPrijs

References

1979 births
Living people
Belgian male cyclists
Sportspeople from Hasselt
Cyclists from Limburg (Belgium)
21st-century Belgian people